Cameron's Line is an Ordovician suture fault in the northeast United States which formed as part of the continental collision known as the Taconic orogeny around 450 mya.  Named after Eugene N. Cameron, who first described it in the 1950s, it ties together the North American continental craton, the prehistoric Taconic Island volcanic arc, and the bottom of the ancient Iapetus Ocean.

Location
Cameron's Line winds southward out of New England through Western Connecticut.  It has been identified in western Connecticut near Ridgefield before it heads into the Bronx, along the East River in Manhattan, through New York Bay, Staten Island and into New Jersey.

Geology
The basement rocks of the Manhattan Formation located on the western side of Cameron's line are metamorphosed sedimentary rocks and can be thought of as the remnants of the edge of the North American continent from 1 billion years ago.  They were formed in roughly this location (autochthonous) and have been tectonically stable over a large period of time.   Through New England, generally, the rocks to the west of Cameron's line are the remnants of an enormous mountain range (the Grenville orogeny), sometimes called the 'crystalline Appalachians,' which once stretched from Newfoundland to Mexico, the local remnants of which are exposed and create the Housatonic Highlands, the New Jersey Highlands and the Manhattan prong (much of the Bronx).

In general, to the east of the line has allochthonous rocks formed elsewhere, which have experienced great tectonic movement in a westward direction on top of the underlying bedrock.  In other words, beginning around 450 million years ago an ocean similar to the Atlantic began to shrink and as it did the North American continent began to collide with island chains which accreted at the edge of the continent and formed the land of what we now call New England.   The major exceptions to this directionality are the most southerly remnants of these ancient collisions, the Serpentinite outcrops that form Hoboken, New Jersey, and Todt Hill, Staten Island, which actually lie to the west of Cameron's line because it makes a U-turn.

Near New York City the term 'line' becomes less applicable, as the multiple collisions - including a much later collision with Africa that created the supercontinent Pangaea Alleghanian orogeny- have warped and folded the boundary into a complex three dimensional shape which was later broken during the rifting process that created the Atlantic Ocean and Newark Basin that split up the supercontinent (this rifting also created the Palisades, which were created by an intrusion of magma from the earth's mantle).  Generally the line creates a hook that generally travels through the Bronx, the western part of Manhattan and down into Staten Island then immediately returns north through Hudson County, New Jersey and eastern Manhattan.

The position of the line in New York City and especially in Manhattan is subject to much debate because of the complex folding patterns in that area.  Due to the violent nature of the Taconic and subsequent Alleghenian Orogeny, the line has been folded and eroded several times.  The material in the line is described as "highly laminated, migmatized, complexly folded- and annealed zones of commingled mylonitic rocks".

References

Geology of the United States
Natural history of North America
Ordovician orogenies